Christy Holly (born 21 December 1984) is a Northern Irish former footballer and coach. From August 12, 2020 to August 31, 2021, he was the head coach of Racing Louisville in the National Women's Soccer League (NWSL). He previously coached NWSL club Sky Blue FC and at Georgian Court University. Holly reached a settlement before leaving Louisville.

Playing career
Holly played in college for Liverpool John Moores University

Coaching career
After serving as an assistant coach in the Sky Blue FC organization for three years, Holly was named head coach in January 2016. He was asked to step down from that position on 16 August 2017, due to complaints of verbal and emotional abuse from players and because his relationship with then team captain, Christie Pearce, had become disruptive to the locker room.

In August 2020, he was hired as head coach of Racing Louisville. On August 31, 2021, Racing Louisville announced that Holly's contract had been terminated "for cause". It was revealed following a wider investigation into the NWSL in 2022 that Holly had been fired ‘with cause’ due to alleged sexual abuse, with the report saying former Racing player Erin Simon had accused Holly of sexual coercion and sexual harassment. 

According to Yates’s report, Holly “repeated the same pattern of misconduct throughout his coaching career at both Sky Blue FC & Racing Louisville.”
The report says Holly sent Erin Simon explicit photos and also requested that she come to his house to review game film “and showed her pornography, while masturbating in front of her before she left,” the report states. The report also found that Holly had never completed the licensing required to coach in the NWSL.

On January 9, 2023, Holly was banned from the NWSL for life, along with three other coaches named in the scandal.

Statistics
All competitive league games (league and domestic cup) and international matches (including friendlies) are included as of August 31, 2021.

Personal life
Holly is a cousin of Gaelic footballer Barry McGoldrick.

Coach Christy Holly is currently engaged to Christie Pearce, former player and team captain at Sky Blue FC (now known as NJ/NY Gotham FC).

References

External links
 Sky Blue assistant coach profile
 Sky Blue head coach profile

1984 births
Living people
National Women's Soccer League coaches
Racing Louisville FC coaches
NJ/NY Gotham FC coaches
Football managers from Northern Ireland
Expatriate sportspeople from Northern Ireland in the United States
Expatriate football managers from Northern Ireland
Expatriate soccer managers in the United States
College women's soccer coaches in the United States
Alumni of Liverpool John Moores University
NJ/NY Gotham FC non-playing staff
Limavady United F.C. players